Leather Peak is located on the border of Alberta and British Columbia and is the highest of the four peaks on Yellowhead Mountain. The peak was named in 1918 by Arthur O. Wheeler.

See also
 List of peaks on the Alberta–British Columbia border
 List of mountains of Alberta
 Mountains of British Columbia

References

Leather Peak
Leather Peak
Canadian Rockies